The Pine Tree Riot was an act of resistance to British royal authority undertaken by American colonists in Weare, New Hampshire on April 14, 1772, placing it among the disputes between Crown and colonists that culminated in the American Revolution.

By the late 17th century the construction and maintenance of the huge number of ships required to build and defend the British Empire left few trees in Britain suitable for use as large spars. Eastern white pines from colonial New England were superior timber for the single-stick masts and booms of the day. To maintain Britain's naval and trading advantage, laws were passed in North America to protect selected white pines for British shipbuilding. British success in the War of Jenkins' Ear (1739–1748) and the Seven Years' War (1756–1763) were due in large part to the control of the seas by the Royal Navy.

Mast pines
In order to preserve suitable timber for the Royal Navy, the New Hampshire General Court passed an act on May 10, 1708 to preserve all trees in New Hampshire suitable for masts for use by the Royal Navy. The act replicated a 1691 law in England and declared all pines with diameter greater than 24 inches to be property of the Crown. Violators faced a fine of 50 pounds for each illegally harvested tree. In 1722 a new law reduced the diameter to 12 inches. "Surveyors of the King's Woods" were assigned by the Crown to identify all suitable "mast pines" with the broad arrow wherever they were found.

The laws contributed to growing discontent with colonial rule, reflected in a series of demonstrations and riots through the 1700s. The 1722 law was not strictly enforced until John Wentworth was appointed governor of the New Hampshire colony in 1766. Although often sympathetic to the colonists, he held firm on this issue.

Pine Tree Riot
John Sherman, Deputy Surveyor of New Hampshire, ordered a search of sawmills in 1771–1772 for white pine marked for the Crown. His men found that six mills in Goffstown and Weare possessed large white pines and marked them with the broad arrow to indicate that they were Crown property. The owners of the mills were named as offenders in the February 7, 1772, edition of The New Hampshire Gazette. The mill owners hired lawyer Samuel Blodgett to represent them, who met with Governor Wentworth. When the governor offered Blodgett the job of Surveyor of the King's Woods, he accepted, and, rather than getting the charges dropped, he instructed his clients to pay a settlement. The mill owners from Goffstown paid their fines at once and had their logs returned to them. Those from Weare refused to pay.

On April 13, 1772, Benjamin Whiting, Sheriff of Hillsborough County, and his Deputy John Quigley were sent to South Weare with a warrant to arrest the leader of the Weare mill owners, Ebenezer Mudgett. Mudgett was subsequently released with the understanding that he would provide bail in the morning. The sheriff and deputy spent the night at Aaron Quimby's inn, the Pine Tree Tavern. That night, many of the townsmen gathered at Mudgett's house. A few offered to help pay his bail, but the majority wanted to run the sheriff and deputy out of town. They decided to physically assault Whiting in his sleep and abuse Whiting's horses by maiming their faces.

At dawn the next day Mudgett led between 20 and 30-40 men to the tavern. Whiting was still in bed, and Mudgett burst in on him. With their faces blackened with soot for disguise, more than 20 townsmen rushed into Whiting's room. They began to beat him with tree branch switches, giving one lash for every tree being contested. The sheriff tried to grab his pistols, but he was thoroughly outnumbered. Rioters grabbed him by his arms and legs, hoisted him up, face to the floor, while others continued to mercilessly assault him with tree switches. Whiting later reported that he thought the men would surely kill him. Quigley was also pulled from his room and received the same treatment from another group of townsmen. The sheriff and deputy's horses were brought around to the inn door. The rioters then cut off the ears and shaved the manes and tails of the horses, after which Whiting and Quigley were forced to ride out of town through a gauntlet of jeering townspeople, shouted at and slapped down the road towards Goffstown.

Whiting engaged Colonel Moore of Bedford and Edward Goldstone Lutwyche of Merrimack, who assembled a posse of soldiers to arrest the perpetrators. The rioters ran and hid in the woods before the posse arrived.  One of the men suspected of assaulting Whiting in his sleep was located, arrested, and revealed the names of the others involved.  Eight men were ordered to post bail and appear in court to answer charges of rioting, disturbing the peace, and "making an assault upon the body of Benjamin Whiting." None of the men were charged with animal cruelty. Four judges, Theodore Atkinson, Meshech Weare, Leverett Hubbard, and William Parker, heard the case in the Superior Court in Amherst in September 1772. The rioters pleaded guilty, and the judges fined them 20 shillings each and ordered them to pay the cost of the court hearing.

Following events
The Pine Tree Riot was a test of the British royal authority which is partially evident by the light fines exacted against the rioters. By demonstrating that British rule was defiable it is believed the riot helped to inspire the Boston Tea Party.

The first Pine Tree Flag flown by colonists against the British during the riot was red with a pine tree within a white square in the upper left corner.

Of the men charged, Timothy Worthley, Jonathan Worthley and William Dustin fought against the British in the Revolutionary War, as did even Samuel Blodgett. Benjamin Whiting fought for the British and had his land confiscated as a Tory sympathizer. Meshech Weare, one of the judges, assisted in framing the New Hampshire constitution adopted in 1776, establishing its own government, and becoming the first colony to declare its independence; Weare became the first President of New Hampshire.

Samuel Blodgett went on to construct the first canal around the Amoskeag Falls on the Merrimack River in Derryfield, completed shortly before his death in 1807. In 1810, the town of Derryfield changed its name to Manchester in honor of Blodgett's vision that the Amoskeag Falls would someday power a manufacturing center to rival Manchester, England. Blodget Street in Manchester is named in his honor.

Participants
John Sherburn – Deputy Surveyor 
Samuel Blodgett – lawyer and later Surveyor 
Benjamin Whiting – County Sheriff
John Quigley – Deputy Sheriff
Aaron Quimby – owner of the Pine Tree Tavern
Ebenezer Mudgett – leader of sawmill owners in Weare, rioter
Colonel Moore – head of a regiment that marched to Weare
Colonel Edward Goldstone Lutwyche – head of a regiment that marched to Weare
Timothy Worthley – resident of Weare, rioter
Jonathan Worthley – resident of Weare, rioter
Caleb Atwood – resident of Weare, rioter
William Dustin – resident of Weare, rioter
Abraham Johnson – resident of Weare, rioter
Jotham Tuttle – resident of Weare, rioter
William Quimby – resident of Weare, rioter and brother of Aaron Quimby
Honorable Theodore Atkinson – Chief Justice
Honorable Meshech Weare – Justice
Honorable Leverett Hubbard – Justice
Honorable William Parker – Justice

In popular culture 
The Pine Tree Riot continues to have a cultural influence today. In 2015 the book An Appeal to Heaven by Dutch Sheets was published. As Sheets records, the Pine Tree flag used during the riots has increased in popularity recently, making "...its way into countless homes, prayer rooms, and even government buildings."

Since 2019, a PDGA sanctioned disc golf tournament named "The Pine Tree Riot" has been held at Salmon Falls disc golf course in Rochester, New Hampshire.

250th Anniversary 
On April 9, 2022, the Weare Historical Society hosted the Pine Tree Riot 250th Anniversary Commemoration and Celebration.

See also
 Pine Tree Flag

References

External links
 Weare Historical Society - "The Pine Tree Riot"
 New Hampshire History Curriculum Sample Lesson Plans - "We Had a Riot"
 "The Pine Tree Riot", Historical article about the Riot.
 An account of the survey of logs by Deputy Surveyor John Sherburn in the History of Goffstown

Further reading
Evans, Connie. "Ebenezer Mudgett and the Pine Tree Riot" (Amazon, 2017) 
 Joseph J. Malone. Pine Trees and Politics (New York: Arno Press, 1979) 
Roberts, Strother E. (2010). Pines, profits, and popular politics: Responses to the White Pine Acts in the colonial Connecticut River Valley. The New England Quarterly, 83(1), 73–101. (The subject of this article is mentioned on page 76.)

1772 riots
American Revolution
New Hampshire in the American Revolution
1772 in New Hampshire